Castanopsis tribuloides is a species of flowering plant in the beech family Fagaceae, native to the Himayalas and higher areas of mainland Southeast Asia. In Vietnam it is cultivated for its edible nuts, and in India it is coppiced for firewood.

References

tribuloides
Flora of West Himalaya
Flora of Nepal
Flora of East Himalaya
Flora of Assam (region)
Flora of Bangladesh
Flora of Tibet
Flora of South-Central China
Flora of Indo-China
Plants described in 1863